An election for the National Assembly was held in Rivers State, Nigeria on Saturday, 28 March 2015.

Results
The results of the elections were announced by the Vice Chancellor of Federal University of Petroleum Prof. John Etu-Efeotor. Released on 30 March 2015, the People's Democratic Party emerged victorious over the All Progressives Congress, winning all 16 seats.

President

|-
! style="background-color:#E9E9E9;text-align:left;" width=400 |Parties
! style="background-color:#E9E9E9;text-align:right;" |Votes
! style="background-color:#E9E9E9;text-align:right;" |Percentage
|-
! style="text-align:left;" |People's Democratic Party (PDP)
! style="text-align:right;" |1,487,075
! style="text-align:right;" |95.00
|-
| style="text-align:left;" |All Progressives Congress (APC)
| style="text-align:right;" |60,238
| style="text-align:right;" |3.85
|-
| style="text-align:left;" |KOWA Party
| style="text-align:right;" |2,274
| style="text-align:right;" |0.15
|-
| style="text-align:left;" |Alliance for Democracy (AD)
| style="text-align:right;" |1,104
| style="text-align:right;" |0.07
|-
| style="text-align:left;" |Action Alliance (AA)
| style="text-align:right;" |1,066
| style="text-align:right;" |0.07
|-
| style="text-align:left;" |African Democratic Congress (ADC)
| style="text-align:right;" |1,031
| style="text-align:right;" |0.07
|-
| style="text-align:left;" |Citizens Popular Party (CPP)
| style="text-align:right;" |577
| style="text-align:right;" |0.04
|-
| style="text-align:left;" |National Conscience Party (NCP)
| style="text-align:right;" |565
| style="text-align:right;" |0.04
|-
| style="text-align:left;" |Hope Democratic Party (HDP)
| style="text-align:right;" |542
| style="text-align:right;" |0.03
|-
| style="text-align:left;" |Allied Congress Party of Nigeria (ACPN)
| style="text-align:right;" |525
| style="text-align:right;" |0.03
|-
| style="text-align:left;" |All Progressives Grand Alliance (APGA)
| style="text-align:right;" |515
| style="text-align:right;" |0.03
|-
| style="text-align:left;" |African Peoples Alliance (APA)
| style="text-align:right;" |513
| style="text-align:right;" |0.03
|-
| style="text-align:left;" |Peoples Party of Nigeria (PPN)
| style="text-align:right;" |492
| style="text-align:right;" |0.03
|-
| style="text-align:left;" |United Democratic Party (UDP)
| style="text-align:right;" |303
| style="text-align:right;" |0.02
|-
| style="text-align:left;" |United Progressive Party (UPP)
| style="text-align:right;" |156
| style="text-align:right;" |0.01
|-
| style="text-align:left;" colspan=1 |Total valid votes||1,565,461||100.0
|-
| style="text-align:left;" colspan=1 |Invalid/blank votes||19,307||1.22
|-
| style="text-align:left;" colspan=1 |Votes cast||1,584,768||100
|-
| style="text-align:left;" colspan=1 |Registered voters||2,324,300||68.20
|-
| style="text-align:left;" colspan=4 |Source: INEC

Senate

Rivers South-East Senate district

Rivers West Senate district

Rivers East Senate district

House of Representatives
As of 30 March 2015, elected members were:
Keys:

See also
2015 Nigerian general election
2015 Nigerian Senate elections in Rivers State

References

2015 Nigerian general election
2015 Rivers State elections
March 2015 events in Nigeria